Manuela Priemer (born November 19, 1978 in Weiden in der Oberpfalz, Bavaria) is a retired female hammer thrower from Germany. She set her personal best (67.26 metres) on June 4, 2003 at a meet in Cottbus.

Achievements

References

1978 births
Living people
People from Weiden in der Oberpfalz
Sportspeople from the Upper Palatinate
German female hammer throwers
World Athletics Championships athletes for Germany